Anastasia Mikhailovna Bodnaruk (born 30 March 1992) is a Russian chess player who holds the FIDE titles of International Master (IM) and Woman Grandmaster (WGM).

Bodnaruk won the under 12 girls' section of the European Youth Chess Championship in 2003.
In 2004, she finished the runner-up in the under 12 girls' division of both European and World Youth Chess Championships. She took the bronze medal in the World U14 Girls Championship of 2005.

In 2008, she won the Russian Junior (Under-20) Girls Championship and helped the Russian team to win the silver medal in the World Youth U16 Chess Olympiad.

In August 2010, Bodnaruk was part of the Russian women's team in the 7th China-Russia Match. The following month, she played in the Russia B team at the Women's Chess Olympiad in Khanty-Mansiysk and won an individual silver medal playing board four.

In 2012, she won for the second time the Russian Junior Girls Championship and tied for the first place, finishing third on tiebreak, in the World Junior Girls Chess Championship. Bodnaruk competed in the Women's World Chess Championship 2012, where she was knocked out in the first round by Lela Javakhishvili.

By winning the women's Russian Championship Higher League of 2013 she qualified for the Russian Women's Championship Superfinal, held later that year, where she finished eighth. In December 2013, she won the Women's Russian Cup, a knockout tournament, by defeating WIM Margarita Schepetkova in the final.

In 2015, Bodnaruk won the Saint Petersburg women's rapid championship and the Russian women's blitz championship. Later that year, she finished second in the Russian Women's Championship Superfinal and played in the gold medal-winning Russian team at the 2015 Women's European Team Chess Championship in Reykjavík.

Bodnaruk won the women's section of the 2016 Moscow Open, edging Soumya Swaminathan and Alexandra Obolentseva on tiebreak.

References

External links 

Anastasia Bodnaruk chess games at 365Chess.com

Living people
1992 births
Chess International Masters
Chess woman grandmasters
Russian female chess players
Chess Olympiad competitors
Place of birth missing (living people)
Universiade medalists in chess
Universiade silver medalists for Russia
Medalists at the 2013 Summer Universiade